Middlesex is the central of the three historic counties into which Jamaica is divided. It has no current-day administrative significance. It covers 5,041.9 km² and has a population of 1,183,361 (about 45% of the island's area and population) giving it the largest area and population of the three counties. It includes Spanish Town, the island's original capital.

The county of Middlesex is shown in pink.

History
Jamaica's three counties were established in 1758 to facilitate the holding of courts along the lines of the British county court system. Middlesex, the middle of the three, was named after an English county of the same name. It was chosen in Jamaica presumably because of its central position. Spanish Town was its county town.

Parishes

References

Counties of Jamaica
1758 establishments in the British Empire